Roggen is a surname. Notable people with the name include:

 Ane Carmen Roggen (born 1978), Norwegian jazz singer
 Ida Roggen (born 1978), Norwegian jazz singer
 Live Maria Roggen (born 1970), Norwegian jazz singer

See also
 George Van Roggen (1921–1992), Canadian Senator and free trade advocate